Liberty Township is a township in Cowley County, Kansas, USA.  As of the 2000 census, its population was 218.

Geography
According to the USGS, it contains two cemeteries: Prairie Ridge and Rose Valley.

The streams of Crabb Creek, Harper Creek, Horse Creek, Pebble Creek and Wildcat Creek run through this township.

References
 USGS Geographic Names Information System (GNIS)

External links
 City-Data.com

Townships in Cowley County, Kansas
Townships in Kansas